was an amusement park in Nerima, Tokyo, Japan, owned by the Seibu Group. It had a variety of rides, including three roller coasters, and a water park with 25 slides and six pools. It closed for good on August 31, 2020.

Attractions

Carousel "El Dorado"
The carousel "El Dorado" is Japan's oldest play machine and is a merry-go-round with a long history in the world.

Produced by Hugo Haase in Munich, Germany in 1907 and premiered publicly at the Oktoberfest. After that, it was operated at carnivals held in various parts of Europe. Due to the deterioration of social conditions, it was transferred to the amusement park Steeplechase Park in Coney Island, New York, in 1911, and was named "El Dorado". Celebrities such as former US President Theodore Roosevelt, Marilyn Monroe, and Al Capone also boarded and were loved by New Yorkers.

The amusement park that operated this vehicle was closed in 1964 due to financial difficulties, so it was planned to be disposed of, but Toshimaen bought it for about 100 million yen in 1969 just before it was disposed of. It was loaded into 6 containers in 1970 and sent to Japan. The restoration cost 200 million yen. A Steeplechase Park admission ticket was found in the vehicle during work.

In 1983, through the Embassy of the United States in Japan and the Consulate-General of Japan in New York, a purchase request came from Coney Island, but Toshimaen replied, "Now, Japanese children are enjoying it," and refused.

Models such as horses are installed on the rotating floor. However, it does not move up and down. The rotating floor is divided into three stages. The outermost floor is the slowest, the middle floor is normal, and the innermost floor rotates the fastest.

The sculpture and decoration are in the Art Nouveau style, and are now a valuable cultural property, and were certified as "Mechanical Engineering Heritage" by the Japan Society of Mechanical Engineers on August 7, 2010.

 submitted a written opinion to the Governor of Tokyo stating that Carousel El Dorado should be left in the "Nerima Castle Ruins Park" that will be built on the site of Toshimaen. After the park is closed, it will be dismantled and stored in the Seibu Group warehouse.

River pool
Toshimaen was the first in the world to have a river pool in 1965. The water park had other facilities as well, such as a children's pool where toddlers could swim in as well, a wave pool, and the Hydropolis with water slides.

Renewal plan
The park closed on 31 August 2020 and will reopen as the Warner Bros. Studio Tour: the making of Harry Potter - Tokyo around spring 2023. This will be the second Potter-themed attraction in Japan after The Wizarding World of Harry Potter in Osaka, and the second Studio Tour dedicated to the Wizarding World with the Warner Bros. Studio Tour located at Leavesden Studios (London). However, not all of the park's 22 hectares will be used for the new theme park. The majority of the Toshimaen site is slated to be purchased by the Tokyo Metropolitan Government after the park is closed and is planned to be a large park that serves as a base for use in the event of a disaster.

Gallery

Access
It is located near Toshimaen Station on the Seibu Toshima Line and Toei Oedo Line.

References

External links

  

Amusement parks in Japan
Defunct amusement parks in Japan
Nerima
Buildings and structures in Tokyo
Tourist attractions in Tokyo
Seibu Group
Amusement parks closed in 2020
2020 disestablishments in Japan